Burtonsville is a census-designated place and an unincorporated area in Montgomery County, Maryland, United States. It is situated in the northeast corner of Montgomery County, right on the border of both Howard and Prince George's counties. It is considered a suburban town in the Washington D.C. Metro Area.

It is 20 miles southwest of downtown Baltimore, 16 miles north of downtown Washington D.C., and 25 miles from Annapolis. Burtonsville recorded a population of 9,498 as of the 2020 census.

History
In colonial times, the area was referred to as the Patuxent Hundred and later the Eastern Branch Hundred, a community comprising approximately 100 inhabitants. Prince George's County Court recorded that on September 27, 1699, Thomas Wells and Thomas Pindell were appointed to be the overseers of Patuxant Hundred.
 
Among some of the earliest land grants are Maiden's Fancy, a  tract surveyed for Neal Clark in 1700, and Bear Bacon nearby, a  tract of land surveyed in 1703 for a Mark Richardson. Another prominent land holder was Richard Snowden, an iron master, who held various land patents in the area, including Snowdens Manor (surveyed 1715) consisting of an impressive  and Snowdens Mill (surveyed 1723) occupying an additional . From these larger tracts, among others, were carved smaller tracts of land which were either rented or sold off to planters and the like.

The community of Burtonsville, originally called Burton's, takes its name from Isaac Burton, who in 1825 bought out his siblings' shares of his father's land and became the major landowner in the area. He and his wife Keturah had 17 children, many of whom stayed in the area as adults. The community itself grew around the intersection of Old Columbia Pike and the road to Sandy Spring. In the 1850s Isaac Burton became the first postmaster of the newly established post office in the vicinity, which operated out of his store at the intersection. Burtonsville's core area today continues to center around the intersection of Maryland Route 198 and U.S. Route 29.

Geography
As an unincorporated area, Burtonsville's boundaries are not officially defined. Burtonsville is, however, recognized by the United States Census Bureau as a census-designated place, and by the United States Geological Survey as a populated place located at  (39.107475, −76.934115).

Demographics

As of the census of 2000, there were 7,305 people, 2,480 households, and 1,919 families residing in the area. The racial makeup of the area was 52.05% White, 25.42% African American, 0.22% Native American, 17.62% Asian, 0.01% Pacific Islander, 1.64% from other races, and 3.04% from two or more races. Hispanic or Latino of any race were 5.60% of the population.

In 2000, 7.97% of Burtonsville residents identified as being of Indian heritage. This was the highest percentage of Indian Americans of any place in Maryland.

There were 2,480 households, out of which 45.5% had children under the age of 18 living with them, 59.6% were married couples living together, 14.2% had a female householder with no husband present, and 22.6% were non-families. 16.4% of all households were made up of individuals, and 2.7% had someone living alone who was 65 years of age or older. The average household size was 2.94 and the average family size was 3.34.

In the area, the population was spread out, with 30.0% under the age of 18, 6.4% from 18 to 24, 35.4% from 25 to 44, 22.1% from 45 to 64, and 6.1% who were 65 years of age or older. The median age was 35 years. For every 100 females, there were 91.1 males. For every 100 females age 18 and over, there were 85.7 males.

The median income for a household in the area was $73,241, and the median income for a family was $76,862. Males had a median income of $52,003 versus $41,133 for females. The per capita income for the area was $26,614. About 2.1% of families and 2.5% of the population were below the poverty line, including 1.9% of those under age 18 and 1.8% of those age 65 or over.

Transportation
Burtonsville is a public transport friendly town. It has over 10 Metro bus stops throughout the town. Residents take advantage of this bus service frequently. The town is also home to the Burtonsville Park & Ride, a large Metro and Charter bus stop/parking lot conveniently located right off of U.S. Route 29 going southbound.

Nearby Airports
There are 3 major airports located within one hour driving: 
 Baltimore–Washington International Airport (BWI), 18 miles
 Ronald Reagan Washington National Airport (Reagan), 28 miles
 Washington Dulles International Airport (Dulles), 37 miles

Major Highways & Roads
 Intercounty Connector (MD 200)
 U.S. Route 29
 Maryland Route 198
 Maryland Route 28, westbound toward Rockville, MD
 Interstate 95, 4 miles east
 Interstate 495 (Capital Beltway), 9 miles via U.S. Route 29 South

Neighborhoods
Burtonsville is broken up into many distinct neighborhoods:
 McKnew (McKnew Road, right off of Maryland Route 198)
 Blackburn (right off of U.S. Route 29)
 Greencastle
 Country Place
 Briarcliff
 Lion's Den
 Dustin Road
 Perrywood Estates
 Peach Orchard
 Riding Stable
 Kruhm Road

Culture
Burtonsville holds an annual "Burtonsville Day", a celebration that includes a parade, festival, craft fair, games for children, live bands, entertainment, and food. The event involves many small social gatherings at different places, with activities such as petting zoos and various games. Burtonsville Cars and Coffee, dubbed "The Church Of The Holy Donut" is an informal gathering of car enthusiasts who meet every Sunday to display all types of vehicles from classic cars to current, stylized automobiles.  One prominent society is the Burtonsville Lions Club, an international group that is a focal point for community service in Burtonsville and surrounding communities.

Education
Burtonsville has three public schools that are part of the Montgomery County Public Schools System. All three schools are located on the same road, Old Columbia Pike. 
 Paint Branch High School
Benjamin Banneker Middle School
Burtonsville Elementary School

References

External links

 
Census-designated places in Maryland
Census-designated places in Montgomery County, Maryland